The railway network in Kosovo consist of  of railway line,  of which are freight-only. The railway infrastructure is operated by Kosovo Railways, a property of the public sector where the state has access to ruling all administrative actions in the Ministry of Economic Development.

History

In Kosovo, the construction of railways lines first took place in 1874 where the first railway line was built between Elez Han, Kosovo Polje and Mitrovica.
This was the beginning of the railway network in Kosovo and it became very significant for the transportation of travellers and goods. Also, it was equally important for the economic development of the country. Likewise, it enabled connectivity with other regions. With the construction of this railway line, railway transportation became amongst the busiest ones which led to opportunities for finding jobs for new railway lines.
During 20th century, the following lines were built: Mitrovica – Lešak and Kosovo Polje – Pristina in 1934, Kosovo Polje – Peja in 1936, Prishina – Podujevo – Livadica in 1949, and Klina – Prizren in 1963.

On 27 September 1999, the Kosovo Train for Life charter train arrived in Pristina, bringing aid and rolling stock in connection with the Kosovo Force peace-keeping efforts.

As of 2014, the rail infrastructure covers most of the country and connects all major cities with the exception of Gjilan and Gjakova.

Trains

Kosovo Railways has a fleet of eight diesel locomotives and four diesel multiple units, either inherited from the Jugoslav Railways or donated by KFOR countries. The railways of Kosovo have a significant role for the transportation of travelers and goods. In 2005, there has been an estimated 870 passengers per day by train. In 2006, there has been an increase by 26.56% more than in 2005, which means that there was a growth by 1,100 passengers daily. In 2007, the number of passengers that have traveled with train in a day was 1,143 or 3.91% more than in 2006. In 2008, there was a decrease in the number of passengers by 18.77% compared to 2007. The average number of passengers per day during 2009 was 1,026 or 10.51% more than in 2008. Also, there has been an increase of passengers per day in 2010 by 1,032 or 0.61% compared to 2009.

Domestic transport 
Kosovo's railway transportations have the following daily schedules:
local train – travels every day from Peja to Pristina and vice versa
free movement train – travels from Elez Han to Kosovo Polje, and from Kosovo Polje to Gračanica and vice versa. Currently, this line is out of function.
Serbian national railway company for passenger transport Srbija Voz operates Kraljevo – North Mitrovica line with RA2 Multiple Unit.

International transport 

For international transport, Kosovo Railways has a regular express train. This train travels once a day from Pristina to Skopje and vice versa.

International connections and services
Kosovo railways connects Pristina with Skopje (North Macedonia) in the south, while Serbian railways connects Mitrovica with Kraljevo (Serbia) in the north. The track between Mitrovica and Kosovo Polje is currently not served by any trains.

 Albania – No connection
 Montenegro – No connection
 North Macedonia – Open
 Serbia – closed in Zvečan/Lešak and closed in Merdare

Statistics

References

External links 
 

Rail
Rail transport in Kosovo